Erika Donalds (born 1980) is an American conservative education activist from Florida. Her spouse is a member of the U.S. House of Representatives.

Background
Donalds holds a bachelor's degree (Florida State University, 2002) and a master's degree (Florida Atlantic University, 2006) in accounting. She worked for New York investment management firm Dalton, Greiner, Hartman, Maher & Co., LLC (DGHM) from 2002 until 2018.

Political activism
In 2013, following a dispute with administrators of her second child's public school in Naples, Donalds placed her child in a private school. She became involved in local efforts (via the group Parents ROCK) to deploy state education funds to establish a charter school, the Mason Classical Academy.

Donalds was a member of the Collier County School Board from 2014 to 2018. She led a group of pro-charter activists in establishing the short-lived Florida Coalition of School Board Members, in opposition to the long-standing Florida School Boards Association.

Donalds was named by Florida House of Representatives Speaker Richard Corcoran to the 2017-2018 Constitution Revision Commission. Governor Ron DeSantis appointed her to the  Advisory Committee on Education and Workforce Development and the Florida Gulf Coast University Board of Trustees.

Donalds is a member of advisory boards for Classical Learning Test, Moms for Liberty, and the Independent Women’s Forum Education Freedom Center.

In December 2022, Donalds hosted a fundraiser for the Classical Education Network featuring Donald Trump.

Education business
In 2017, Donalds founded Optima Ed, a company that provides management support for six Hillsdale College-affiliated "classical" charter schools in Florida. Optima is funded by a 10% cut of state funding to its schools, bringing in millions of dollars annually.

Personal life
Donalds married Byron Donalds on March 15, 2003. They have three children: Damon, Darin and Mason. They live in Naples, Florida.

See also
 School choice in Florida
 Step Up For Students

References

External links
Optima Ed

Living people
1930 births
People from Collier County, Florida
Education activists
Education in Collier County, Florida
Florida Atlantic University alumni
Florida State University alumni